Steenburg Mountain is a mountain located in the Catskill Mountains of New York north-northwest of Windham. High Knob is located northwest, Sicklers Mountain is located west-southwest, South Mountain is located south, and Mount Pisgah is located southeast of Steenburg Mountain.

References

Mountains of Schoharie County, New York
Mountains of New York (state)